Vladyslav Volodymyrovich Hryko (born January 25, 1997) is a Ukrainian male artistic gymnast and a member of the national team. He participated at the 2015 World Artistic Gymnastics Championships in Glasgow, and qualified for the 2016 Summer Olympics.

Two years before his senior Olympic debut, Hryko secured two medals, a silver in the pommel horse, and a bronze in the rings, at the 2014 Summer Youth Olympics in Nanjing, China.

Competitive history

References

External links 
 

1997 births
Living people
Ukrainian male artistic gymnasts
Place of birth missing (living people)
Gymnasts at the 2014 Summer Youth Olympics
Gymnasts at the 2016 Summer Olympics
Olympic gymnasts of Ukraine
European champions in gymnastics
Universiade medalists in gymnastics
Universiade silver medalists for Ukraine
Medalists at the 2017 Summer Universiade
Competitors at the 2019 Summer Universiade
Sportspeople from Kharkiv
21st-century Ukrainian people